Arthur Riscoe MC (1896–1954) was a British stage and film actor.

Early life
He was born Arthur Charles Boorman on 19 November 1896 in Sherburn-in-Elmet near Leeds, but at the age of 15 moved to Tasmania as a farm worker.  When 18, he joined the Australian Imperial Forces. He served as a lieutenant during World War I and was awarded the Military Cross for his actions on the Western Front in August 1918. Later he was part of an AIF entertainment troupe.

Career 
His stage career began in 1919 with a part in The Lilac Domino, and he returned to the UK in 1920, slowly building popularity till the 1930s when he was well established in light comedy, and had significant film roles.  He appeared as Widow Twankey at the Adelphi Theatre in 1937.

He married Olive Raymond, and their daughter Maureen Riscoe was an actress and casting director.

He died of a heart attack on 6 August 1954 at his home in London.

Selected filmography
 Horatio's Deception (1920)
 For the Love of Mike (1932)
 For Love of You (1933)
 Public Nuisance No. 1 (1936)
 Paradise for Two (1938)
 Kipps (1941)

References

External links

"Arthur Riscoe and Slater 1938" at British-Pathe

1896 births
1954 deaths
Male actors from Leeds
Australian recipients of the Military Cross
English male film actors
20th-century English male actors